William Dowling may refer to:

William Dowling (VC) (1825–1887), Irish recipient of the Victoria Cross
William C. Dowling (born 1944), American professor of English
William Dowling (politician), Northern Irish politician
Willie Dowling, English multi-instrumentalist